Federal Motor Vehicle Safety Standard 401 (FMVSS 401) establishes the requirement for providing a trunk release mechanism which allows a person trapped inside the trunk compartment to escape from the compartment in a passenger car in the United States.  This standard does not apply to vehicles with a hinged back door found on hatchbacks and station wagons.   Like all other Federal Motor Vehicle Safety Standards, FMVSS 401 is administered by the United States Department of Transportation's National Highway Traffic Safety Administration.

This standard specifies requirements for passenger cars that have trunk compartments be equipped with an interior trunk release making it possible for a trapped person to escape from the compartment.  The release can be either manual or automatic.  If manual, it must be visible from inside the closed trunk and if automatic it must unlatch within five minutes of trunk closure.

See also
 FMVSS

References

External links
https://www.nhtsa.gov/sites/nhtsa.dot.gov/files/tp-401-01.pdf

Automotive safety
Automotive standards
Standards of the United States